Aleksander Aurdal (born 25 March 1988) is a Norwegian freestyle skier. He was born in Bodø. He competed at the 2014 Winter Olympics in Sochi, where he placed seventh in slopestyle.

References 

1988 births
Living people
Freestyle skiers at the 2014 Winter Olympics
Norwegian male freestyle skiers
Sportspeople from Bodø
Olympic freestyle skiers of Norway